Edith Maude Marie Bolte MacCracken (February 16, 1869 – April 1946) was an American club woman and civic leader.

Early life
Edith Maude Marie Bolte was born on February 16, 1869, in Chicago, the daughter of William Henry Bolte and Jane Usher Baker.

Career
Edith Bolte MacCracken was president of the Ashland Civic Club; president of the District Federation of Women's Clubs; State Regent of the Daughters of the American Revolution. 

She was a member of the Order of the Eastern Star and the General Society of the War of 1812. 

From 1934 to 1935 she was the president of the American Legion Auxiliary to the Jackson County Medical Society. In April 1935 she conducted a survey to collect biographical data of Jackson County physicians from 1850 to 1935.

Personal life
Edith Bolte MacCracken moved to Oregon in 1916 and lived in Ashland, Oregon.

On March 15, 1900, in Chicago, she married Dr. Samuel Gordon MacCracken, the vice-president of the Jackson County Medical Society in 1924, and had three children: Chester Caldwell, Charles Gordon, Elliott Bolte. 

She died in April 1946.

Legacy
The Edith Bolte MacCracken Collection on the History of the Physicians of Jackson County, 1935-1946 is hosted at Oregon Health & Science University, Historical Collections & Archives.

References

1869 births
1946 deaths
People from Ashland, Oregon
People from Chicago
Clubwomen